Join Java is a programming language based on the join-pattern that extends the standard Java programming language with the join semantics of the join-calculus.  It was written at the University of South Australia within the Reconfigurable Computing Lab by Dr. Von Itzstein.

Language characteristics 
The Join Java extension introduces three new language constructs:
 Join methods
 Asynchronous methods
 Order class modifiers for determining the order that patterns are matched

Concurrency in most popular programming languages is implemented using constructs such as semaphores and monitors.  Libraries are emerging (such as the Java concurrency library JSR-166) that provide higher-level concurrency semantics.  Communicating Sequential Processes (CSP), Calculus of Communicating Systems (CCS) and Pi have higher-level synchronization behaviours defined implicitly through the composition of events at the interfaces of concurrent processes.  Join calculus, in contrast, has explicit synchronization based on a localized conjunction of events defined as reduction rules.   Join semantics try to provide explicit expressions of synchronization without breaching the object-oriented idea of modularization, including dynamic creation and destruction of processes and channels.

The Join Java language can express virtually all published concurrency patterns without explicit recourse to low-level monitor calls.  In general, Join Java programs are more concise than their Java equivalents. The overhead introduced in Join Java by the higher-level expressions derived from the Join calculus is manageable.  The synchronization expressions associated with monitors (wait and notify) which are normally located in the body of methods can be replaced by Join Java expressions (the Join methods) which form part of the method signature.

Join methods 
A Join method is defined by two or more Join fragments. A Join method will
execute once all the fragments of the Join pattern have been called.
If the return type is a standard Java type then the leading fragment will
block the caller until the Join pattern is complete and the method has
executed. If the return type is of type signal then the
leading fragment will return immediately. All trailing fragments are
asynchronous so will not block the caller.

Example:
 class JoinExample {
    int fragment1() & fragment2(int x) {
       //will return value of x
       //to caller of fragment1
       return x;
    }
 }

Ordering modifiers 
Join fragments can be repeated in multiple Join patterns so there can be
a case when multiple Join patterns are completed when a fragment is called.
Such a case could occur in the example below if B(), C() and D() then A() are
called. The final A() fragment completes three of the patterns so there are
three possible methods that may be called. The ordered class
modifier is used here to determine which Join method will be called.
The default and when using the unordered class modifier is
to pick one of the methods at random. With the ordered
modifier the methods are prioritised according to the order they are declared.

Example:
 class ordered SimpleJoinPattern {
    void A() & B() {
    }
    void A() & C() {
    }
    void A() & D() {
    }
    signal D() & E() {
    }
 }

Asynchronous methods 
Asynchronous methods are defined by using the signal
return type. This has the same characteristics as the void
type except that the method will return immediately. When an asynchronous
method is called a new thread is created to execute the body of the method.

Example:
 class ThreadExample {
    signal thread(SomeObject x) {
       //this code will execute in a new thread
    }
 }

Related languages 
Polyphonic C sharp is the closest related language.
Cω the successor of Polyphonic C sharp.

Hardware Join Java language further extended Join Java to implement Hardware semantics.  This language extended the semantics of Join Java to FPGA applications.

References 
 von Itzstein, G, Stewart. and Jasiunas, M (2003). On Implementing High Level Concurrency in Java. Advances in Computer Systems Architecture 2003, Aizu Japan, Springer Verlag.
 von Itzstein, G, Stewart. and D. Kearney (2002). Applications of Join Java. Proceedings of the Seventh Asia Pacific Computer Systems Architecture Conference ACSAC'2002. Melbourne, Australia, Australian Computer Society: 1-20.
 von Itzstein, G, Stewart. and D. Kearney (2004). The Expression of Common Concurrency Patterns in Join Java. International Conference on Parallel and Distributed Processing Techniques and Applications, Las Vegas.
 Hopf, J., von Itzstein, G, Stewart, et al. (2002). Hardware Join Java: A High Level Language For Reconfigurable Hardware Development. International Conference on Field Programmable Technology, Hong Kong.

External links 
 Website

Concurrent programming languages
Programming languages
Programming languages created in 2000
2000 software